Modern chess is a chess variant played on a 9×9 board. The game was invented by Gabriel Vicente Maura in 1968. Besides the usual set of chess pieces, each player has a prime minister and an additional pawn: 

  The prime minister (M) combines powers of a bishop and a knight.

The first match was played in Madrid at Escuela de Bellas Artes de San Fernando's cafe on March 18, 1968. The players were Gabriel Vicente Maura himself (White), and Bonifacio Pedraz Cabezas (Black).

Game rules 

The starting setup is as shown. All the standard rules of chess apply, along with the following special rules:
 A player can castle either ministerside (notated "0-M-0") or queenside (notated "0-Q-0"); in either case the king slides two squares toward the castling rook. 
 When reaching the final rank, pawns can promote to one of the usual pieces or to prime minister.

Optional rule 
In response to criticism that bishops are restricted to only one square color, the inventor proposed an optional new rule, if the players agree:
 One bishop may switch its position with a piece adjacent to it, provided that the bishop and the piece adjacent have not yet moved in the game. The switch is counted as a normal move.

See also
 Chancellor Chess – a 9×9 variant featuring one chancellor per side

References 

Bibliography

External links 
 Modern Chess by Hans Bodlaender, The Chess Variant Pages
 Gabriel Maura's Modern Chess a simple program by Ed Friedlander (Java)

Chess variants
1968 in chess
Board games introduced in 1968